The Blaine Street Stairs are an outdoor staircase in Seattle's Capitol Hill neighborhood, in the United States. Adjacent to the Streissguth Gardens and parallel to the Howe Street Stairs, the staircase has 293 steps.

References

External links
 

Capitol Hill, Seattle
Stairways in the United States